This is a list of women writers who were born in Brazil or whose writings are closely associated with that country.

A
Carine Adler (born 1948), screenwriter, film director
Zuleika Alambert (1922–2012), feminist writer, politician
Sarah Aldridge, pen name of Anyda Marchant (1911–2006), Brazilian-born American lesbian novelist, short story writer
Eugênia Álvaro Moreyra (1898–1948), journalist, actress, theatre director
Miriam Alves (born 1952), poet, short story writer
Maria Adelaide Amaral (born 1942), playwright, screenwriter, novelist
Narcisa Amalia (1856–1924), poet, journalist, women's rights activist
Suzana Amaral (1932–2020), film director, screenwriter
Leilah Assunção (born 1943), significant playwright, actress

B
Bruna Beber (born 1984), poet, writer
Carol Bensimon (born 1982), short story writer, novelist
Tati Bernardi (born 1979), short story writer, novelist, screenwriter, journalist
Beatriz Francisca de Assis Brandão (1779–1868), poet, literary and theatrical translator
Eliane Brum (born 1966), journalist, novelist, non-fiction writer

C
Astrid Cabral (born 1936), acclaimed poet, educator
Alice Dayrell Caldeira Brant (1880–1970), young diarist
Joyce Cavalccante (born 1963), novelist, poet, short story writer
Kátya Chamma (born 1961), singer, poet
Marina Colasanti (born 1937), Italian-born Brazilian novelist, short story writer, poet, journalist, translator
Cora Coralina (1889–1985), poet, children's writer
Giselle Cossard (1923–2016) French Brazilian Anthropologist
Ana Cristina Cesar (1952–1983), poet, translator
Mariana Coelho (1857–1954), essayist, poet, educator, feminist
Sonia Coutinho (1939–2013), journalist, short story writer, novelist
Helena Parente Cunha (born 1929), poet, novelist, short story writer, educator

D
Márcia Denser (born 1949), magazine editor, columnist, short story writer
Maria José Dupré (1905–1984), popular novelist, author of Éramos Seis

E
Conceição Evaristo (born 1946), novelist, poet, short story writer

F
Lygia Fagundes Telles (1918–2022), novelist, short story writer
Francisca Praguer Fróes (1872–1931), physician, feminist, non-fiction writer
Nísia Floresta (1810–1885), early feminist writer
Eva Furnari (born 1948), Italian-born children's writer

G
Zélia Gattai (1916–2008), photographer, memoirist, novelist, children's writer
Ivone Gebara (born 1944), nun, feminist theologian, religious writer
Luisa Geisler (born 1991), short story writer, novelist
Ruth Guimarães (1920–2014), first Afro=Brazilian author to gain a national audience for novels, short stories, and poetry

H
Hilda Hilst (1930–2004), poet, playwright, novelist

I
Inez Haynes Irwin (1873–1970), Brazilian-born American novelist, short story writer, non-fiction writer, journalist, feminist

J
Noemi Jaffe (born 1962), novelist, educator
Jaqueline Jesus (born 1978), psychologist, gay rights activist, non-fiction writer
Carolina Maria de Jesus (1914–1977), diarist

K
Helena Kolody (1912–2004), poet

L
Ângela Lago (1945–2017), children's author
Maria Lacerda de Moura (1887–1945), anarchist, journalist, non-fiction writer
Danuza Leão (1933–2022), columnist, non-fiction writer
Vange Leonel (1963–2014), singer, journalist, novelist, playwright, feminist
Elsie Lessa (1912–2000), journalist, novelist
Henriqueta Lisboa (1901–1985), widely translated poet, essayist, translator
Clarice Lispector (1920–1977), acclaimed novelist, short story writer, journalist
Elisa Lispector (1911–1989), novelist
Júlia Lopes de Almeida (1862–1934), early Brazilian female novelist, short story writer, playwright, feminist
Lya Luft (1938–2021), novelist, poet, translator

M
Ana Maria Machado (born 1941), children's writer
Gilka Machado (1893–1980), poet
Lúcia Machado de Almeida (1910–2005), poet, novelist, children's writer
Maria Clara Machado (1921–2001), playwright, children's writer
Tânia Martins (born 1957), poet
Olga Maynard (1913–1994), Brazilian-born prolific American non-fiction writer
Cecília Meireles (1901–1964), acclaimed poet
Ana Miranda (born 1951), novelist
Ana Montenegro (1915–2006), poet, feminist writer, communist writer
Rose Marie Muraro (1930–2014), sociologist, feminist writer

N
Adalgisa Nery (1905–1980), poet, short story writer, journalist, politician
Lucila Nogueira (1950–2016), poet, essayist and short story writer

O
Marly de Oliveira (c.1938–2007), prolific poet, educator
Orlandina de Oliveira (born 1943), Brazilian-born Mexican sociologist, academic, non-fiction writer

P
Elvira Pagã (1920–2003), film actress, writer, singer
Alina Paim (1919–2011), novelist, children's literature, feminist writer, communist writer
Pagu, pen name of Patrícia Rehder Galvão (1910–1962), poet, novelist, playwright, journalist, translator
Paula Parisot (born 1978), writer
Nélida Piñon (1937–2022), novelist, short story writer
Adélia Prado (born 1935), poet, poetry translated into English

Q
Rachel de Queiroz (1910–2003), journalist, novelist, playwright, non-fiction writer

R
Regina Rheda (born 1957), Brazilian-born American novelist, short story writer, children's writer
Esmeralda Ribeiro (born 1958), journalist, novelist
Maria Firmina dos Reis (1825–1917), novelist, poet

S
Carola Saavedra (born 1973), novelist
Miêtta Santiago (1903–1995), poet, lawyer, feminist
Yde Schloenbach Blumenschein (1882–1963), poet, memoirist
Diná Silveira de Queirós (1911–1922), novelist, short story writer, playwright, essayist, children's writer
Alessandra Silvestri-Levy (born 1972), art patron, non-fiction writer
Angelina Soares (1910–1985), feminist writer
Heloneida Studart (1932–2007), novelist, essayist, playwright, columnist, women's rights activist
Auta de Souza (1876–1901), poet
Syang, stage name of Simone Dreyer Peres (born 1968), musician, erotic writer

T
Malvina Tavares (1866–1939), anarchist, poet, educator
Lygia Fagundes Telles (1918–2022, novelist, short story writer
Lourdes Teodoro (born 1946), Afro-Brazilian poet and literary critic
Marcia Theophilo (born 1941), poet, short story writer, essayist, writes in Portuguese, Italian and English
Wal Torres (born 1950), sexologist, non-fiction writer

V
Luize Valente (born 1966), novelist, film maker, journalist
Edla Van Steen (1936–2018), journalist, broadcaster, actress, short story writer, playwright
Vira Vovk (1926–2022), Ukrainian-born Brazilian poet, novelist, playwright, translator, writing in Ukrainian, German and Portuguese

References

See also
List of women writers
List of Brazilian writers
List of Portuguese-language authors

-
-
Brazilian women writers, List of
Women writers, List of Brazilian
Writers, List of Brazilian
Writers